Atlanta californiensis is a species of sea snail, a holoplanktonic marine gastropod mollusk in the family Atlantidae.

Description
The shell grows to a length of 3.5 mm.

Distribution
This species occurs in the Northern Pacific Ocean.

References

External links
 Gastropods.com: Atlanta (Inflata sp. group) californiensis; accessed : 23 August 2011

Atlantidae
Gastropods described in 1993